Hecyra terrea is a species of beetle in the family Cerambycidae. It was described by Bertoloni in 1849. It is known from Angola, Botswana, Namibia, Zimbabwe, Mozambique, Kenya, Tanzania, Malawi, and the Democratic Republic of the Congo.

References

Crossotini
Beetles described in 1849